The Moshannon Valley School District is a diminutive, rural public school district in Clearfield County, Pennsylvania. It serves the boroughs of Houtzdale, Brisbin,  Ramey,  and Glen Hope plus the townships of Gulich, Jordan, Bigler, and Woodward. Moshannon Valley School District encompasses approximately 148 square miles. According to 2000 federal census data, it serves a resident population of 8,764. In 2009, the district residents’ per capita income was $13,356, while the median family income was $34,882. In the Commonwealth, the median family income was $49,501 and the United States median family income was $49,445, in 2010.

Schools
 Moshannon Valley Elementary School - Grades K-65026 Green Acre RoadHoutzdale, Pennsylvania 16651
 Moshannon Valley Junior/Senior High School - Grades 7-124934 Green Acre RoadHoutzdale, Pennsylvania 16651

Extracurriculars
The district offers a variety of clubs, activities and sports.

Athletics

Boys Athletics
 Baseball - Class A
 Basketball - Class AA
 Football - Class A
 Wrestling - Class A

Girls Athletics
 Basketball - Class A
 Soccer - Class AA
 Softball - Class A
 Volleyball - Class A

References

External links
 Moshannon Valley School District
 Penna. Intrer-scholastic Athletic Assn.

School districts in Clearfield County, Pennsylvania